Felisianus Junius Rato Bate (born 9 June 1993) simply known as Junius R. Bate is an Indonesian professional footballer who plays as a full-back for Liga 2 club Persela Lamongan.

Club career

Kalteng Putra
He was signed for Kalteng Putra to play in Liga 2 in the 2020 season. This season was suspended on 27 March 2020 due to the COVID-19 pandemic. The season was abandoned and was declared void on 20 January 2021.

PSM Makassar
In June 2021, Junius confirmed his transfer to PSM Makassar.

Persiba Balikpapan (loan)
In 2021, Junius signed a contract with Indonesian Liga 2 club Persiba Balikpapan, on loan from PSM Makassar in the 2021 season. He made his league debut on 20 October against Persewar Waropen at the Tuah Pahoe Stadium, Palangka Raya.

References

External links
 Junius Bate at Soccerway
 Junius Bate at Liga Indonesia

1993 births
Living people
Indonesian footballers
Persiwa Wamena players
Association football defenders
Liga 1 (Indonesia) players
Bali United F.C. players
PSM Makassar players
People from Buleleng Regency
Sportspeople from Bali